Hate Me Now is the ninth mixtape by American rapper Dave East. It was released on October 1, 2015, by Mass Appeal Records. The mixtape features guest appearances from Nas, Rico Love, Pusha T, Styles P, Tray Pizzy, Jadakiss, Mack Wilds, and Floyd Miles.

Track listing

References

2015 mixtape albums
Dave East albums
Albums produced by Jahlil Beats
Albums produced by Don Cannon
Mass Appeal Records albums